Archibald Douglas, 1st Earl of Forfar, 2nd Earl of Ormonde (3 May 1653 – 11 November 1712) was a Scottish peer.

He was the second son and youngest child of Archibald Douglas, Earl of Angus and 1st Earl of Ormond, by his second wife, Jean Wemyss, the daughter of David Wemyss, 2nd Earl of Wemyss and the Hon. Anna Balfour of Burleigh. He was also the younger half-brother of James Douglas, 2nd Marquess of Douglas and the younger brother of Lady Margaret Douglas, wife of Alexander Seton, 1st Viscount of Kingston.

He was made the Earl of Forfar and Lord of Wandell and Hartside on 2 October 1661 at the age of eight. He married Robina Lockhart (1662–1741), daughter of Sir William Lockhart of Lee and Robina Sewster, on 19 August 1679 at Lincoln's Inn Chapel, London, England.

His only son, Archibald Douglas, 2nd Earl of Forfar, was born in 1692.

He was a Privy Counsellor to both King William III and Queen Anne from 1689 until his death in 1712. He served as Commissioner of the Privy Seal from 1689 to 1690 and Commissioner for the Treasury from 1704 to 1705.

In 1700, he moved the family residence from Bothwell Castle to his new mansion, Bothwell House, which was dubbed "New Bothwell Castle".

He voted for the Act of Union in 1707, having allegedly received £100 in payment from the English.

He died on 11 November 1712 and was buried in Bothwell Church, Scotland.

References

|-

1653 births
1712 deaths
Earls of Forfar
Earls of Ormond
Members of the Convention of the Estates of Scotland 1689
Commissioners of the Treasury of Scotland